Eburodunum is a Gaulish placename.

Eburodunum was the ancient name of:
Brno, Czech republic (debatable)
Embrun, Hautes-Alpes, France
Yverdon-les-Bains, Switzerland

See also
Eburones
Gaulish placenames